The A249 is a road in Kent, England, running from Maidstone to Sheerness on the Isle of Sheppey. It mainly functions as a link between the M2 and M20 motorways, and for goods vehicle traffic to the port at Sheerness.

In 2006 an upgraded dual carriageway section opened between Iwade and Queenborough, including a new fixed crossing over the Swale.  The existing lifting Kingsferry Bridge has been retained as an alternative route. On 5 September 2013 more than 100 vehicles were involved in an accident on the crossing.

Route
The A249 begins close to Maidstone town centre, where it commences by heading eastwards from the southbound A229 Lower Stone Street along first Mote Road and then along Wat Tyler Way. Due to Maidstone's one-way system, the westbound carriageway extends along for a short way along Knightrider Street (towards the Archbishop's Palace, Maidstone) before it then ends, as it meets the northbound carriageway of the A229. At the top of Wat Tyler Way, where that road meets King Street, the A249 occupies a small gyratory system which joins the A20 (heading east to Ashford).

From here, the A249 heads north on Albion Place. This very quickly becomes the Sittingbourne Road (crossing over the Maidstone East railway station -Bearsted railway station). After passing Vinters Park, and reaching the north end of the town at the Chiltern Hundreds roundabout (named after the adjacent pub). This old route (Maidstone and Sittingbourne) is broken as the old Sittingbourne Road has become a Park and Ride facility.

This break occurred during the 1990s, as the result of works to widen and upgrade the former A20(M) Maidstone Bypass section of the M20 to remove a bottleneck on the newly completed motorway. Instead of following its old course, the route turns east onto the Bearsted Road towards Grove Green, becoming a dual carriageway before turning north again just before Newnham Court Farm. Here, the route crosses the M20, rejoining the Sittingbourne Road at the exit of the motorway roundabout. From this point onwards, the route becomes Primary.

The road then climbs up onto the Downs via Detling Hill, past the village of Detling and crossing the Pilgrim's Way and North Downs Way (between Boxley and Thurnham). Just after the M20 junction where it meets Pilgrim's Way, is a footbridge called Jade's Crossing, named after the schoolgirl who died along with her grandmother in a road accident in 2000 whilst attempting to cross the busy road in the absence of such a bridge. Immediately after the footbridge, the carriageways diverge, with the northbound carriageway taking a higher route up the hill and the southbound carriageway taking a separate lower route where it negotiates a chicane at the bottom of the steep hill.

After Detling Hill, the road becomes known as the Maidstone road and passes the Kent County Showground (on the left) and White Horse Wood (on the right). Further on the road passes a large layby on the northbound carriageway, which was closed in 2005 after local residents complained that it was a haunt of doggers. The road passes the village of Stockbury (on the left), then heads to a junction coming off the M2.

From here the route used to carry on as a single carriageway road towards Sheppey on the old Maidstone Road, however a new dualled Maidstone Road running parallel but slightly west was completed in the mid nineties and this is the route that the A249 follows now under the M2 viaduct. The route now passes the hamlets of Danaway and Chestnut Street.  The next junction on the A249, comes at Key Street, where it meets the A2, which heads left to Newington and Rainham to the west or right Sittingbourne to the east.

From here the route continues across the flat plains of Swale, past Bobbing (on the left), Kemsley and Milton Regis (on the right). As it approaches Swale railway station on the southern banks of the Swale, the road now becomes the Sheppey Way which now bridges the Swale via the Sheppey Crossing, opened in 2006, having previously used the Kingsferry Bridge which has to be lifted to allow ships to pass on the Swale. Non-motorised traffic still uses the old route and rejoins the A249 on the island.

Once on the Isle of Sheppey, the road follows a new dual carriageway built in conjunction with the new bridge as far as Queenborough. Then it returns to its old single carriageway route along Brielle way into Sheerness, past Blue Town (on the left), before ending at a roundabout near the seaport and former passenger ferry port in Sheerness. Here the A249 becomes the A250 on Bridge Road.

In 2020, Kent County Council installed mobile CCTV cameras along the A249 in anticipation of HGV backlogs due to Brexit.

Future 
Work is due to start in September 2021 on converting a roundabout at the junction with the M2 into a flyover.

References

External links 

Highways Agency – Iwade-Queenborough improvements
Highways Agency – Iwade-Queenborough improvements (photos)

Roads in Kent